Robert E. Farnan (June 11, 1877 – January 10, 1939) was an American rower who competed in the 1904 Summer Olympics. He was born and died in New York City. In 1904 he won the gold medal in the coxless pairs.

References

External links
 profile 

1877 births
1939 deaths
Rowers at the 1904 Summer Olympics
Olympic gold medalists for the United States in rowing
American male rowers
Medalists at the 1904 Summer Olympics